Suesat Paeminburi is a Thai Muay Thai fighter. His natural weight is 58.5 kg (129 lb; 9.2 st).

Titles and accomplishments 

 2020 Channel 7 Stadium 118 lbs Champion
 2019 Channel 7 Fight of the Year (vs Chokdee Nuikafaeboran)
 2nd Grakcu Tournament Champion (2017)

Fight record 

|- style="background:#fbb;"
| 2023-02-03 || Loss || align=left| Liu Zhipeng  || Wu Lin Feng 533: China vs Thailand || Zhengzhou, China || Decision (Unanimous) || 3 || 3:00

|- style="background:#fbb;"
|2021-02-07
|Loss
| align="left" | Phetpailin SorJor.Tongprachin
|Channel 7 Stadium
|Bangkok, Thailand
|Decision
|5
|3:00
|- style="background:#c5d2ea;"
|2020-12-08
|Draw
| align="left" | Phetpailin SorJor.Tongprachin
|Lumpinee Birthday Show, Lumpinee Stadium
|Bangkok, Thailand
|Decision
|5
|3:00
|- style="background:#c5d2ea;"
|2020-11-09
|Draw
| align="left" | SaoTho Sitchefboonthum
|Chef Boontham, Rangsit Stadium
|Rangsit, Thailand
|Decision
|5
|3:00
|- style="background:#cfc;"
|2020-10-05
|Win
| align="left" | SaoTho Sitchefboonthum
|R1 UFA, World Siam Stadium
|Bangkok, Thailand
|Decision
|5
|3:00
|- style="background:#cfc;"
|2020-07-12
|Win
| align="left" | Wanchalong P.K.Saenchai
|Channel 7 Stadium
|Bangkok, Thailand
|TKO (referee stoppage)
|4
|
|-
! colspan="8" style="background:white" |Wins the 118 lbs Channel 7 Stadium title.
|- style="background:#cfc;"
|2020-02-27
|Win
| align="left" | Suesuk Sor.Phannoot
|Muayprajaoprom + Kiatphetch, Maesai Chiangrai Stadium
|Chiang Rai, Thailand
|KO
|2
|
|- style="text-align:center; background:#cfc;"
|2019-09-29
|Win
| align="left" | Kangkaodaeng Huarongnamkeng
|Channel 7 Stadium
|Bangkok, Thailand
|KO
|4
|
|- style="text-align:center; background:#cfc;"
|2019-08-25
|Win
| align="left" | Chokdee Nuikafaeboran
|Channel 7 Stadium
|Bangkok, Thailand
|Decision
|5
|3:00
|- style="background:#cfc;"
|2019-06-30
|Win
| align="left" | Donking Singmawin
|Nonthaburi Stadium
|Nonthaburi, Thailand
|Decision
|5
|3:00
|- style="background:#cfc;"
|2019-05-25
|Win
| align="left" | Narindet Kor.Thasai
|Lumpinee Stadium
|Bangkok, Thailand
|KO
|4
|
|- style="text-align:center; background:#cfc;"
|2019-01-20
|Win
| align="left" | Saifon Rattanapanu
|Channel 7 Stadium
|Bangkok, Thailand
|Decision
|5
|3:00
|- style="background:#cfc;"
|2018-11-29
|Win
| align="left" | Kongsak Sor.Sattra
|Rajadamnern Stadium
|Bangkok, Thailand
|Decision
|5
|3:00
|- style="background:#FFBBBB;"
|2018-07-22
|Loss
| align="left" | Superjeng Sor.Samangarment
|Channel 7 Stadium
|Bangkok, Thailand
|Decision
|5
|3:00
|- style="background:#cfc;"
|2018-06-05
|Win
| align="left" | Saifon Rattanapanu
|Lumpinee Stadium
|Bangkok, Thailand
|KO
|3
|
|- style="text-align:center; background:#FFBBBB;"
|2018-05-01
|Loss
| align="left" | Longern Dabransarakham
|Lumpinee Stadium
|Bangkok, Thailand
|KO (head kick) 
|2
|
|- style="text-align:center; background:#cfc;"
|2017-12-03
|Win
| align="left" | Pompetch Sitnumnoi
|Lumpinee Stadium
|Bangkok, Thailand
|Decision
|5
|3:00
|- style="background:#cfc;"
|2017-11-05
|Win
| align="left" | Wanmeechok Sakburiram
|Channel 7 Stadium
|Bangkok, Thailand
|Decision
|5
|3:00
|- style="background:#FFBBBB;"
|2017-09-08
|Loss
| align="left" | Superjeng Sor.Samangarment
|Lumpinee Stadium
|Bangkok, Thailand
|Decision
|5
|3:00
|-
! colspan="8" style="background:white" |For the vacant 118 lbs Lumpinee Stadium title.

|- style="background:#FFBBBB;"
|2017-07-30
|Loss
| align="left" | Superjeng Por.Phinnaphat
|Channel 7 Stadium
|Bangkok, Thailand
|Decision
|5
|3:00
|- style="background:#cfc;"
|2017-06-25
|Win
| align="left" | Mahamongkol Sor.Yingcharoenganchang
|Channel 7 Stadium
|Bangkok, Thailand
|Decision
|5
|3:00
|- style="background:#FFBBBB;"
|2017-05-21
|Loss
| align="left" | Phetmuangpair Ayongym
|Channel 7 Stadium
|Bangkok, Thailand
|Decision
|5
|3:00
|- style="background:#cfc;"
|2017-03-26
|Win
| align="left" | Superjeng Por.Phinnaphat
|Channel 7 Stadium
|Bangkok, Thailand
|Decision
|5
|3:00
|- style="background:#c5d2ea;"
|2017-02-26
|Draw
| align="left" | Rungpetch Phetjaroen
|Nonthaburi Stadium
|Nonthaburi, Thailand
|Decision
|5
|3:00
|- style="background:#cfc;"
|2017-01-08
|Win
| align="left" | Phetmuangpair Ayongym
|Or.Tor.Gor.3 Stadium
|Nonthaburi, Thailand
|Decision
|5
|3:00
|-
! colspan="8" style="background:white" |Wins 2nd Grakcu Tournament and ฿150,000 Grand Prize.
|- style="background:#cfc;"
|2016-09-25
|Win
| align="left" | Wuttichai Singbansang
|Or.Tor.Gor.3 Stadium
|Nonthaburi, Thailand
|Decision
|5
|3:00
|- style="background:#cfc;"
|2016-07-17
|Win
| align="left" | Phetthaksin Tor.Muangkao
|Or.Tor.Gor.3 Stadium
|Nonthaburi, Thailand
|Decision
|5
|3:00
|- style="background:#cfc;"
|2016-06-12
|Win
| align="left" | Phettho Por.Chalad
|Or.Tor.Gor.3 Stadium
|Nonthaburi, Thailand
|KO
|2
|
|- style="text-align:center; background:#cfc;"
|2016-05-08
|Win
| align="left" | Saeb Parunchai
|Rajadamnern Stadium
|Bangkok, Thailand
|Decision
|5
|3:00
|- style="background:#cfc;"
|2016-04-09
|Win
| align="left" | Wuttichai Singbansang
|Rajadamnern Stadium
|Bangkok, Thailand
|Decision
|5
|3:00
|- style="background:#cfc;"
|2016-03-13
|Win
| align="left" | Esanumchai Dabpomahachai
|Rangsit Boxing Stadium
|Rangsit, Thailand
|KO
|4
|
|- style="text-align:center; background:#cfc;"
|2016-01-31
|Win
| align="left" | Singkao Sitphuphantu
|Rangsit Boxing Stadium
|Rangsit, Thailand
|Decision
|5
|3:00
|- style="background:#cfc;"
|2016-01-07
|Win
| align="left" | Naruedet Theglafpattaya
|Rajadamnern Stadium
|Bangkok, Thailand
|Decision
|5
|3:00
|- style="background:#FFBBBB;"
|2015-12-06
|Loss
| align="left" | Naruedet Theglafpattaya
|Jitmuangnon Stadium
|Bangkok, Thailand
|Decision
|5
|3:00
|- style="background:#FFBBBB;"
|2015-11-01
|Loss
| align="left" | Phetpailin Sitnayoktawiptapong
|Jitmuangnon Stadium
|Bangkok, Thailand
|KO
|5
|
|- style="text-align:center; background:#FFBBBB;"
|2015-09-13
|Loss
| align="left" |  Khunsuknoi Sitkaewprapon
|Channel 7 Stadium
|Bangkok, Thailand
|Decision
|5
|3:00
|- style="background:#cfc;"
|2015-08-02
|Win
| align="left" | Nopakao Sitsettu
|Rajadamnern Stadium
|Bangkok, Thailand
|Decision
|5
|3:00
|- style="background:#FFBBBB;"
|2015-05-30
|Loss
| align="left" | Phetpailin Sitnayoktawiptapong
|Lumpinee Stadium
|Bangkok, Thailand
|Decision
|5
|3:00
|- style="background:#FFBBBB;"
|2015-03-17
|Loss
| align="left" | Sri-Uthai Sor.Jor.Piek-Uthai
|Lumpinee Stadium
|Bangkok, Thailand
|Decision
|5
|3:00
|- style="background:#cfc;"
|2015-01-18
|Win
| align="left" | Manutongkam Sitpanunchuang
|Jitmuangnon Stadium
|Bangkok, Thailand
|Decision
|5
|3:00
|- style="background:#cfc;"
|2014-12-21
|Win
| align="left" | Superchamp Rachanon
|Jitmuangnon Stadium
|Bangkok, Thailand
|KO
|3
|
|- style="text-align:center; background:#FFBBBB;"
|2014-11-22
|Loss
| align="left" | Duangsompong Jitmuangnon
|Lumpinee Stadium
|Bangkok, Thailand
|Decision
|5
|3:00
|- style="background:#cfc;"
|2014-10-25
|Win
| align="left" | Thanapetch Pornchaijit
|Lumpinee Stadium
|Bangkok, Thailand
|KO
|3
|
|- style="text-align:center; background:#fbb;"
|2014-02-01
|Loss
| align="left" | Yotpawarit Sasiprapagym
|Lumpinee Stadium
|Bangkok, Thailand
|Decision
|5
|3:00
|-
| colspan=9 | Legend:

References 

1993 births
Suesat Paeminburi
Living people
Suesat Paeminburi